Maxwell West Alexander (born February 17, 1957) is an American journalist and editor. He was a senior editor at People Weekly.  Before his job at People, Alexander served as executive editor of Variety and Daily Variety, where he edited The 1936 History of Show Business (Abrams).

Alexander was born in Grand Rapids, Michigan in 1957, and earned a baccalaureate of arts in art history from Columbia University in 1987.

A resident of Rome, Italy since 2019, Alexander writes for Smithsonian, Reader's Digest, and many other national magazines. He co-wrote  Call Me American (Knopf), Chow Chow (Balbo), The Arrows Cookbook (Scribner) and Two for the Money (Carroll & Graf) and edited George Plimpton's last book, Ernest Shackleton.

Alexander's first memoir, Man Bites Log: The Unlikely Adventures of a City Guy in the Woods, was published in 2004. A chronicle of his brother's adventure building a business in Ghana, West Africa, Bright Lights, No City, was published by Hyperion Books in July 2012.

In 2020, he competed in the tenth season of MasterChef Italia.

References

External links
 
"Final Roar: On Editing George Plimpton's Last Book, and Getting to Know His Remarkable World in the Process", Boston Phoenix, October 3–9, 2003
 

1957 births
American magazine editors
Columbia College (New York) alumni
Writers from Grand Rapids, Michigan
Living people
20th-century American journalists
American male journalists